The Geumho River flows through North Gyeongsang Province, South Korea, and drains into the Nakdong River.  It rises in the hilly area of western Pohang, flows west for 116 kilometers before its meeting with the Nakdong in western Daegu.  It drains an area of more than 2,000 square kilometers.  Notable tributaries include the Sincheon, which flows north through Daegu.  The name Geumho-gang means "river of the zither-shaped lake," a reference to its oxbow curve in northern Daegu.  Much of the riverbank in Daegu has been transformed into parkland.

Ecological conditions
The Geumho has been among the most polluted rivers in South Korea largely because of industrial waste from nearby large-scale dyeing operations. This is especially important because the Geumho is a tributary of the Nakdong river.  Samples of water have consistently received low grades on the water grading system of the Korean government. Communities allege that the water quality problem stemmed from the development of the Wicheon complex. The regional environment office of Daegu reported a new ecological plan to improve water quality around the rivers in 2008, including improvement of water circulation and the rivers' ecosystems.

See also
List of rivers of Korea
Geography of South Korea

References

Rivers of North Gyeongsang Province
Rivers of Daegu
Rivers of South Korea